The 1869 Waterford City by-election was fought on 22 November 1869.  The by-election was fought due to the resignation (Inspector of Irish Fisheries) of the incumbent MP of the Liberal Party, John Aloysius Blake.  It was won by the Liberal candidate Sir Henry Winston Barron.

References

1869 elections in the United Kingdom
By-elections to the Parliament of the United Kingdom in County Waterford constituencies
Politics of Waterford (city)
November 1869 events
1869 elections in Ireland